The 1918 North Dakota gubernatorial election was held on November 5, 1918. Incumbent Republican Lynn Frazier defeated Democratic nominee S. J. Doyle with 59.75% of the vote.

Primary elections
Primary elections were held on June 26, 1918.

Democratic primary

Candidates
S. J. Doyle
G. W. Wilkinson

Results

Republican primary

Candidates
Lynn Frazier, incumbent Governor
John Steen, North Dakota State Treasurer

Results

General election

Candidates
Lynn Frazier, Republican
S. J. Doyle, Democratic

Results

References

1918
North Dakota
Gubernatorial